Lord Babs is a 1932 British comedy film directed by Walter Forde and starring Bobby Howes, Jean Colin and Pat Paterson. It was based on the 1925 play of the same title by Keble Howard. It was once believed to be a lost film, but was rediscovered.

Cast
 Bobby Howes as Lord Basil 'Babs' Drayford
 Jean Colin as Nurse Foster
 Pat Paterson as Helen Parker
 Alfred Drayton as Ambrose Parker
 Arthur Chesney as Mr Turpin
 Clare Greet as Mrs Parker
 Hugh Dempster as Dr. Neville
 Joe Cunningham as Chief Steward

References

External links
Lord Babs (1932) on BFI website

1932 films
Films directed by Walter Forde
1932 comedy films
British comedy films
Gainsborough Pictures films
British films based on plays
British black-and-white films
1930s rediscovered films
Rediscovered British films
Films set in France
Films set in London
Seafaring films
1930s English-language films
1930s British films